Thessia is a genus in the family Hesperiidae (Eudaminae).

Species
Thessia athesis  (Hewitson, 1867) Venezuela, Colombia, Panama
Thessia jalapus  (Plötz, 1881) Mexico, Belize

References

Natural History Museum Lepidoptera genus database

External links
Images representing Thessia at Consortium for the Barcode of Life

Hesperiidae
Butterflies of Central America
Hesperiidae of South America
Butterflies of North America
Lepidoptera of Colombia
Lepidoptera of Venezuela
Fauna of the Amazon
Hesperiidae genera